Northville Pond is a lake that is located by Northville, New York. Fish species present in the lake are rainbow trout, pumpkinseed sunfish, and brown bullhead. There is a carry down off South Main Street in Northville.

References

Lakes of New York (state)
Lakes of Fulton County, New York